Beylik of Tanrıbermiş was a small and short-lived principality in western Anatolia (modern Turkey) during the late 11th century.

After the battle of Malazgirt in 1071, Oghuz Turkmen (Turkoman) tribes led by ghazi warriors began to settle in hitherto Byzantine-controlled Anatolia. A ghazi named Tanrıbermiş was one of them. Beginning by 1074 he founded a beylik (principality) in western Anatolia. His realm included Philadelphia (modern Alaşehir) and Ephesus. However, during the First Crusade in 1098 his territory was recovered by the forces of the  Byzantine Emperor Alexios I Komnenos. The Turks weren't able to penetrate as far as western Anatolia for about two centuries, until the Aydinids. Even after that, Philadelphia wasn't captured by the Turks until 1390.

References

States and territories established in the 1070s
States in medieval Anatolia
Seljuk dynasty
History of Manisa Province
11th century in the Byzantine Empire